The 2017 Saskatoon Meewasin provincial by-election was a held on March 2, 2017. The vote was called after the death of incumbent MLA Roger Parent of the Saskatchewan Party, who died of cancer on November 29, 2016.

Candidate Ryan Meili won the election, gaining the seat for the New Democratic Party.

Background 
On February 3, Chief Electoral Officer of Saskatchewan Dr. Michael Boda issued the writ for a March 2 by-election to Saskatoon Meewasin's returning officer Lloyd Howey. Candidate nominations would be accepted until February 14, with advance voting days set from February 24 to February 28. Premier Wall chose to hold the election before the Legislative Assembly of Saskatchewan returned for the spring period.

Candidates 
The New Democratic Party nominated Ryan Meili, who had previously run for the party's leadership in 2009 and 2013.

The Saskatchewan Party nominated Brent Penner, the executive director of Downtown Saskatoon. Penner defeated hopefuls Marv Friesen and Roxanne Kaminski at a party nomination meeting on January 30.

Liberal Party leader Darrin Lamoureux announced his candidacy for the by-election on January 18. 

The Progressive Conservative Party nominated David Prokopchuk, the chairman of Saskatoon's Ukrainian Day in the Park.

The Green Party nominated their leader Shawn Setyo, who ran in the riding of Saskatoon Eastview in the previous provincial election.

Results 

|-

References

See also 

 2022 Saskatoon Meewasin provincial by-election

2017 elections in Canada
2017 in Saskatchewan
Provincial by-elections in Saskatchewan
Politics of Saskatoon
March 2017 events in Canada